The parang (Dusun: dangol) is a type of knife used across the Malay archipelago. It is often mistakenly assumed to be a sword; however, there is no evidence that it has ever been used in a formal military conflict, nor that its intended purpose was to be used as a combat weapon. Although some may argue that it could be called a machete or a chopper as it is a direct variation of the modern machete, its academic status remains as a knife.

Design
Typical vegetation in South East Asia is more woody than in South America, and the parang is therefore optimized for a stronger chopping action with a heavier blade and a "sweet spot" farther forward of the handle; the blade is also beveled more obtusely to prevent it from binding in the cut. This is the same rationale and (in practical terms) the same design as the Indonesian golok and very similar to the Filipino bolo. The parang blade ranges from 10 to 36 inches (25.4 to 91.44 cm) in length. The parang has a weight of up to 2 lb (0.9 kg) and the edge usually uses a convex grind. The parang has three different edges: the front is very sharp and used for skinning, the middle is wider and used for chopping, and the back end (near the handle) is very fine and used for carving. A parang handle is normally made out of wood or horn, with a wide end to prevent slips in wet conditions. The tang of the parang is usually of hidden tang design, but full tang designs are also available.

Uses 

Like the machete, the parang is frequently used in the jungle as well as being a tool for making housing, furniture, and tools. The parang has been noted in John "Lofty" Wiseman's SAS Survival Handbook for this use. Wiseman points out that by grinding three different angles in three separate regions along the Parang blade—a narrow angle at the tip for skinning and fine cutting work; a wide, chopping blade angle along the bow in the blade for ax work, and an all-purpose hunting/survival knife angle along the edge nearest the handle for general purpose work—the parang becomes a very useful, and compact all-purpose tool in the bush.

Parang are recorded being used in attacks against the British and Japanese. They are typically carried as weapons by gang members and robbers in Malaysia, Singapore, India, and Sri Lanka, due to these countries having strict gun laws.

Parangs were used by North Borneo guerillas against the Japanese in the Jesselton Revolt during the Japanese occupation of British Borneo.

See also

 Golok
 Kukri

References

Knives
Machetes
Filipino swords
Blade weapons
Indonesian culture
Malaysian culture
Weapons of Indonesia
Weapons of Malaysia
Malayan swords
Weapons of the Philippines